Sister Mary Scullion, R.S.M. is a Philadelphia-based American Roman Catholic religious sister and activist, named by "Time" as one of the "100 Most Influential People in the World" in 2009, alongside Michelle Obama and Oprah Winfrey.

Career
Scullion joined the Sisters of Mercy and began working on behalf of the homeless in 1976. She has been involved in service work and advocacy for homeless and mentally ill persons since 1978. She was a co-founder in 1985 of Woman of Hope, which provides permanent residences and support services for homeless mentally ill women.

In 1988, she founded the Outreach Coordination Center, the nation's first program that coordinated city private and public agencies to assist people living on the streets with special needs in finding housing and shelter in a more systematic way. The following year, she and her associate, Joan Dawson McConnon, co-founded Project H.O.M.E., a nationally recognized organization that provides supportive housing, employment, education and health care to enable chronically homeless and low-income persons to break the cycle of homelessness and poverty in Philadelphia. Under their guiding vision, "None of us are home until all of us are home", Project HOME is committed to ending and preventing chronic street homelessness.

Project HOME has grown from an emergency winter shelter to over 600 units of housing, with an additional 200 units in development, and ten businesses that provide employment to formerly homeless persons. It includes the Honickman Learning Center and Comcast Technology Labs, a state-of-the-art technology center in North Central Philadelphia that offers after-school enrichment opportunities for students, a college access program, and educational and occupational programming for adults. In 2015, Project HOME opened the Stephen Klein Wellness Center, a federally qualified health center (FQHC) that provides integrated health care including primary care, behavioral health, dental, a YMCA, pharmacy and wellness services.

Sister Mary is also a powerful voice on political issues affecting homelessness and mentally ill persons. Her advocacy efforts resulted in the right of homeless persons to vote as well as a landmark federal court decision that affects the fair housing rights of persons with disabilities.

Awards/honors/affiliations
Sister Mary has received numerous awards and honorary doctorates for her leadership in the City of Philadelphia. She received the 1992 Philadelphia Award, and Eisenhower Fellowships selected Scullion as a 2002 Eisenhower Fellow. She and Joan Dawson McConnon were national awardees of the Ford Foundation's prestigious "Leadership for a Changing World Award" in 2002 and received the Laetare Medal from the University of Notre Dame in 2011, which is the highest award given to an American Catholic. In 2013, Sister Mary was awarded the James Cardinal Gibbons Award from The Catholic University of America. The Harvard Observer recognized Sister Mary's Lifetime advocacy achievement.

She serves on the board of The Jon Bon Jovi Soul Foundation and as a trustee at Saint Joseph's University in Philadelphia. In 2010, she was appointed by Mayor Michael Nutter to serve on the City of Philadelphia's Board of Ethics.

She was the commencement speaker at Georgetown University's graduation ceremonies on May 20, 2017.

Education
 Graduated 1971 from Little Flower Catholic High School for Girls.  (Philadelphia, PA)
 Religious Training/Association, Congregation of the Sisters of Mercy, Merion, Pennsylvania, 1972 to the present
 Saint Joseph's University, Psychology (BA), 1976
 Temple University, School of Social Administration (MSW), 1986

Notes

References

 Fagan, Kevin. "Success in the City of Brotherly Love." San Francisco Chronicle, June 13, 2004.
 Lin, Jennifer. "Mary of Mercy." The Philadelphia Inquirer, April 18, 2010.
 "Reminding us of the forgotten." The Philadelphia Inquirer, January 1, 2012.

1950s births
American humanitarians
Women humanitarians
20th-century American Roman Catholic nuns
American anti-poverty advocates
Homelessness activists
Living people
Political activists from Pennsylvania
Clergy from Philadelphia
Sisters of Mercy
Laetare Medal recipients
Eisenhower Fellows
21st-century American Roman Catholic nuns